Gymnocarena monzoni is a species of tephritid or fruit flies in the genus Gymnocarena of the family Tephritidae.

Distribution
Guatemala.

References

Tephritinae
Insects described in 2012
Diptera of North America